O. nepalensis may refer to:

 Ophiocordyceps nepalensis, a parasitic fungus
 Oreorchis nepalensis, a plant native to Asia
 Orthogonius nepalensis, a ground beetle
 Orthosia nepalensis, an owlet moth